Events from the year 1322 in the Kingdom of Scotland.

Incumbents
Monarch – Robert I

Events
3 August – Death of Yolande of Dreux, Queen of Scotland.
14 October – Victory for Scots at the Battle of Old Byland in Yorkshire.

See also

 Timeline of Scottish history

References

 
Years of the 14th century in Scotland
Wars of Scottish Independence